Mundia Sikatana ( 1938 – 14 June 2012; Lusaka) was a Zambian politician, diplomat and lawyer.

Career
In 2002, Siktana was appointed Minister of Agriculture. He and his government faced widescale media condemnation for banning genetically modified maize donations during a widescale famine in 2002. Upon the re-election of President Levy Mwanawasa in 2006, Sikatana was appointed foreign minister on 9 August 2006. On 22 August 2007, the former ally of Mwanawasa was fired as foreign minister with Mwanawasa citing Sikatana's declining health. However, on 3 September, Siktana refuted that claim, citing instead his reputation as an anti-Mugabe politician and Mwanawasa's better relationship with Mugabe following his appointment as head of the Southern African Development Community.

He trained as a lawyer and during the one party rule by the first president Kenneth Kaunda, Sikatana championed the cause for justice and the respect of human rights.

References

1938 births
2012 deaths
Zambian diplomats
20th-century Zambian lawyers
Foreign Ministers of Zambia
Agriculture ministers of Zambia